Burgh and Tuttington is a civil parish in the English county of Norfolk.
For the purposes of local government, it falls within the district of Broadland. The parish includes Burgh next Aylsham and Tuttington.

Burgh next Aylsham has a grade I listed church dedicated to Mary, which features a notable fifteenth-century baptismal font. The church was restored in the late nineteenth century by Richard Phipson.

Tuttington church of SS Peter and Paul is a grade II* listed building.

Burgh Mill

Burgh Mill is a large Grade II* listed water mill dating from the early 18th century but greatly enlarged in the late 18th century and early 19th century. The basic machinery is probably early 19th century. It is built in 3 storeys with an attic from a clapboarded timber frame with some colour-washed brick to lower storey and internally. The roofs are pantile and some corrugated iron.

References

External links

Civil parishes in Norfolk
Broadland